Les Epesses is a commune in the Vendée department in the Pays de la Loire region in western France.

It is best known for the Puy du Fou historical theme park.

Geography 
The municipal territory of Les Epesses covers 3,156 hectares. The average altitude of the commune is 182 meters, with levels fluctuating between 118 and 254 meters.

See also
Communes of the Vendée department
 Puy du Fou

References

Communes of Vendée